The 2002 Connecticut gubernatorial election took place on November 5, 2002. Incumbent Republican Governor John G. Rowland won reelection to a third consecutive term, defeating Democrat Bill Curry. Rowland became the first Connecticut Governor to win a third term in office, but did not finish his term, resigning in 2004 due to allegations of corruption. Despite losing this election, as of 2021, Curry is the last Democratic gubernatorial  candidate to carry Windham County.

General election

Candidates

Democratic
Bill Curry, Counselor to the President under Clinton Administration, nominee in 1994 
Running mate: George Jepsen, Connecticut State Senator

Republican
John G. Rowland, incumbent Governor of Connecticut 
Running mate: Jodi Rell, incumbent Lieutenant Governor of Connecticut

Predictions

Results

References
 

Gubernatorial
2002
Connecticut